The 1976 Tulane Green Wave football team was an American football team that represented Tulane University during the 1976 NCAA Division I football season as an independent. In their first year under head coach Larry Smith, the team compiled a 2–9 record.

Schedule

Roster

References

Tulane
Tulane Green Wave football seasons
Tulane Green Wave football